Hamilton County is a county in the U.S. state of New York. As of the 2020 census, the population was 5,107, making it the least populous county in New York. With an area nearly the size of Delaware, it is the least densely populated county east of the Mississippi River. Its county seat is Lake Pleasant.  The county was created in 1816 and organized in 1847.

Hamilton County is one of only two counties that lie entirely within the Adirondack Park (Essex being the other). Because of its location in the park, any development in the county is restricted by the New York State Constitution, which designates the park as "forever wild." There are no permanent traffic lights in the county, and much of the county has no cell phone service.

Etymology

The county is named after Alexander Hamilton, the only member of the New York State delegation who signed the United States Constitution in 1787 and later the first United States Secretary of the Treasury.

History

On April 12, 1816, Hamilton County was created by partitioning  from Montgomery County, but due to low population it remained unorganized and administered from Montgomery County, N.Y. until it was recognized as sufficiently prepared for self-government on January 1, 1838. The organization process was completed by summer 1847.

On May 24, 1915, land was swapped between Hamilton and Essex counties, with Hamilton ceding Fishing Brook Mountain for Indian Lake. Hamilton gained an additional , whereas Essex County lost .

The former town of Gilman was dissolved in 1860. The original county seat was Sageville, now part of Lake Pleasant.

Geography

It is New York's third-largest county by land area and fifth-largest by total area.

Hamilton County is in the state's north central section, northwest of Albany. It lies entirely within Adirondack Park and consists mostly of publicly owned parkland.

The county is very mountainous, broken up by rivers and lakes. The county is famous for its lakes. Indian Lake, and Long Lake are both famous for their long length, small width, and erratic shape, similar to the Finger Lakes. Other notable lakes include Piseco Lake, Lewey Lake, Raquette Lake, Sacandaga Lake, and Lake Pleasant. While notable mountains include: Snowy Mountain, Panther Mountain, and Buell Mountain.

Adjacent counties
 Franklin County - north
 Essex County - northeast
 Warren County - east
 Saratoga County - southeast
 Fulton County - south
 Herkimer County - west
 St. Lawrence County - northwest

Demographics

As of the 2020 census, among the 5,107 residents the racial makeup of the county was 93.69% White, 0.61% Black or African American, 0.27% Native American, 0.23% Asian, 0.02% Pacific Islander, 0.43% from other races, and 4.74% from two or more races. 1.96% of the population were Hispanic or Latino of any race. Additional demographics are based on older data. As of the census of 2000, there were 5,379 people, 2,362 households, and 1,558 families residing in the county.

There were 2,362 households, out of which 23.60% had children under the age of 18 living with them, 55.70% were married couples living together, 6.70% had a female householder with no husband present, and 34.00% were non-families. 29.60% of all households were made up of individuals, and 13.70% had someone living alone who was 65 years of age or older.  The average household size was 2.24 and the average family size was 2.74.

In the county, the population was spread out, with 19.70% under the age of 18, 5.20% from 18 to 24, 24.20% from 25 to 44, 30.90% from 45 to 64, and 20.00% who were 65 years of age or older.  The median age was 45 years. For every 100 females there were 100.00 males.  For every 100 females age 18 and over, there were 99.40 males.

The median income for a household in the county was $32,287, and the median income for a family was $39,676. Males had a median income of $29,177 versus $21,849 for females. The per capita income for the county was $18,643.  About 6.00% of families and 10.40% of the population were below the poverty line, including 10.50% of those under age 18 and 8.70% of those age 65 or over.

Research published in 2016 found that Hamilton County had by far the highest suicide rate in the state of New York; at 28 per 100,000 people. This meant that Hamilton County had a suicide rate more than double the national average and more than triple the state average of 13 and 8.4 per 100,000 people respectively. Though the report found instances of suicide to be significantly higher in Upstate generally, the rate in Hamilton County was disproportionate regardless of region; being 22.1, high though still significantly lower, in Lewis County, which was found to have the second highest rate in New York.

2020 Census

Government and politics

|}

Hamilton County has long been one of the most consistently Republican counties in New York. Since Woodrow Wilson carried the county in 1916, the Republican candidate has lost only once, when Barry Goldwater in 1964 failed to win a single county in the state. The county was Goldwater's third strongest in the state however. In the 2008 U.S. presidential election, John McCain carried Hamilton County by a 26.9% margin over Barack Obama, with Obama winning statewide by a virtually equal margin over McCain; Republican nominee Mitt Romney won the county over President Obama in the 2012 election, too. Hamilton gave McCain the highest margin of victory in the state.

It was the only county won by Howard Mills over incumbent Chuck Schumer in the 2004 U.S. Senate election. It also voted for John Faso over Eliot Spitzer for governor in 2006, and for John Spencer 55.5%-42.1% over incumbent Hillary Clinton for the U.S. Senate in 2006, despite Faso and Spencer both losing in landslides statewide. It was one of only a handful of counties outside Western New York to have voted for Carl Paladino over eventual winner Andrew Cuomo for Governor in 2010.

Democrat Kirsten Gillibrand, however, won the county in her bid to be elected for a full term to the U.S. Senate in 2012.

Transportation

Airports
The following public use airports are located in the county:
 Piseco Airport (K09) – Piseco
 Long Lake Helms Seaplane Base (NY9) – Long Lake
 Long Lake Sagamore Seaplane Base (K03) – Long Lake

Ground

 NY-8
 NY-10
 NY-28
 NY-28N
 NY-30

Communities

Larger Settlements

Towns

 Arietta
 Benson
 Hope
 Indian Lake
 Inlet
 Lake Pleasant
 Long Lake
 Morehouse
 Wells

Villages
 Speculator

Other hamlets
 Arietta
 Benson
 Blue Mountain Lake
 Higgins Bay
 Hoffmeister
 Hope
 Hope Falls
 Indian Lake
 Inlet
 Lake Pleasant (county seat)
 Piseco
 Raquette Lake
 Upper Benson

Former hamlet
 Sabattis (formerly Long Lake West)

See also

 List of counties in New York
 National Register of Historic Places listings in Hamilton County, New York

References

Further reading

External links
 Hamilton County Information
  More county data
 
 Speculator Region Chamber of Commerce 
  Brief history

 
Adirondacks
1847 establishments in New York (state)
Populated places established in 1847
Adirondack Park